Shopaholic is a Norwegian television series first broadcast on TV3 in 2004. Pia Haraldsen and Hilde Marstrander judged consumer products on this shopping program.

Winner
Julia B. Lyon
Oslo

Finalists
Renate Virving
Elin Beatrice Thomassen
Janis Maria Wilson
Julia B Lyon
Gyda Katrine Bloch Thorsen
Christine Bråthen
Linda Ramstad Dypvig
Suzie Kraman
Colleen Christiansen

References

TV3 (Norway) original programming